Edward "Eddie" Moylan (September 14, 1923 – May 26, 2015) was an Irish American tennis player in the mid-20th century. Moylan was a member of the U.S. Davis Cup Team, Davis Cup Coach and a gold medal winner at the 1955 Pan American Games with Art Larsen.

Career
Moylan's finest hour was perhaps the 1947 Spring Lake Bathing and Tennis Club singles when he brought to an end the 9-year tenure of Frankie Parker at Spring Lake.  After his victory against Parker, Moylan went on to defeat Gardnar Mulloy in the final round of the tournament to win the men's singles.

After his playing career, Moylan taught tennis and was the head tennis and squash coach at Cornell University from 1962 to 1972. He died on May 26, 2015 in Ithaca, New York.

References

External links 
 

1923 births
American male tennis players

Cornell Big Red men's squash coaches

2015 deaths
Sportspeople from Trenton, New Jersey
Tennis people from New Jersey
Tennis players at the 1955 Pan American Games
Pan American Games medalists in tennis
Pan American Games bronze medalists for the United States
Cornell Big Red men's tennis coaches
American tennis coaches
Medalists at the 1955 Pan American Games